Dune is the debut album by Japanese rock band L'Arc-en-Ciel. It was released by the independent label Danger Crue Records, first in a limited edition on April 10, 1993, and followed by a regular edition on April 27, which contained an additional tenth track. The regular edition reached number 1 on the Oricon indies chart on May 10.

A 10th anniversary edition of Dune was released on April 21, 2004. It was remastered and contains three bonus tracks.

Overview
A recording of "Floods of Tears" was previously released as a single on November 25, 1992. The version of the song included on the album is different and does not feature original drummer Pero. The band previously contributed "Voice" to the 1992 omnibus album Gimmick, featuring Pero as well.

"Shutting from the Sky" was originally titled "Claustro Phobia". Although the album version is credited to the band, former guitarist Hiro originally composed the track. "Dune" was originally called "Call for Me", and was later re-recorded by the band's Punk~en~Ciel alter-ego for 2008's "Drink It Down". "Tsuioku no Joukei" was previously titled "Call to Mind" and originally composed by Hiro, although the album version is credited to the band.

To promote the album, music videos for "Dune" and "As if in a Dream" were created. Although a live performance of "Claustro Phobia" was earlier included on the band's self-titled and freely distributed first home video in 1992.

Track listing

Personnel
 hyde – vocals
 ken – guitar
 tetsu – bass guitar, backing vocals
 sakura – drums
 pero – drums on tracks 11 and 12
 Kenji Shimizu – keyboard on tracks 11 and 12

References

1993 debut albums
L'Arc-en-Ciel albums
Japanese-language albums